Tamarillo is a flowering plant famous for its fruit.

Tamarillo may also refer to:
 Tamarillo (horse) (1992–2015), an Olympic medallist
 Tamarillo, a 2006 album by Olivia Ong